Victor is a ghost town in Blue Hills Township, Mitchell County, Kansas, United States.

History
Victor was issued a post office in 1879. The post office was discontinued in 1941. The population in 1910 was 40.

References

Former populated places in Mitchell County, Kansas
Former populated places in Kansas